-stan has the meaning of "a place abounding in" or "a place where anything abounds" as a suffix. It originated in the Persian language, but is widely used by other Iranic languages as well as the Shaz Turkic languages (excluding Siberian Turkic) and other languages historically influenced by Persian. The suffix appears in the names of many regions throughout Central and South Asia, and parts of the Caucasus and Russia.

Places with the -stan suffix were part of Iran in the past. The derived suffix -standar (or ostandar) was used for administrative titles of -stan governors under the Sasanian Empire in Persia.

Etymology and cognates 
The suffix -stan is analogous to the suffix -land, present in many country and location names. The suffix is also used more generally, as in Persian  "place of sand, desert",  "place of flowers, garden",  "graveyard, cemetery", Hindustân "land of the Hindus".

Originally an independent noun, this morpheme evolved into a suffix by virtue of appearing frequently as the last part in nominal compounds. It is of Indo-Iranian and ultimately Indo-European origin. It is cognate with the English word state, and with Sanskrit , meaning "the act of standing", from which many further meanings derive, including "place, location; abode, dwelling", and ultimately descends from Proto-Indo-Iranian .

Countries 
 
 
 
 
 
 
 

Some of these nations were also known with the Latinate suffix  during their time as Soviet republics: Turkmenistan was frequently Turkmenia, Kyrgyzstan often Kirghizia, and even Uzbekistan was very rarely Uzbekia. In addition, the native name of Armenia is Hayastan, hay being the self-designation of Armenians.

Country names in various languages

Administrative divisions 

The following table lists the subnational entities of different countries that end with -stan.

Administrative subdivisions 

The following list shows some examples of some second-level, third-level, and fourth-level subdivisions inside different countries that have their names ending in a -stan-like suffix.

In Afghanistan

In Armenia

In Iran 

Dehestan is the name of an administrative division in Iran.

In Pakistan

In Tajikistan

In other countries

Regions 
 Arabistan – the name of the Arabian Peninsula and other meanings
 Arbayistan – a Sasanian Satrap in Late Antiquity
 Asal Hindustan – a name for the Kingdom of Nepal
 Asoristan – the province of Babylonia under the Sassanid Empire
 Azadistan – a short-lived state in the Iranian province of Azarbaijan under Mohammad Khiabani
 Balawaristan – a revived historical name of Gilgit-Baltistan, Pakistan
 Balochistan/Baluchistan – a region in Iran, Afghanistan, and Pakistan
 Baltistan – a northern region in Pakistan
 Bantustan – an Apartheid-era South African and South West African black 'homeland' (the term coined by analogy)
 Cholistan Desert – a desert region in Punjab, Pakistan
 Dardistan – a region in northern Pakistan of Dardu speakers
 Dihistan – a Sasanian province
 East Pakistan – the historic name for pre-independence Bangladesh
 East Turkestan or Uyghuristan – a region dominated by Uyghurs, located in northwest China
 Frangistan – a historical term used (by Muslims and Persians in particular) to refer to Western or Christian Europe
 Gharchistan – a medieval region in Afghanistan
 Hazaristan – the Hazarajat, homeland of the Hazaras in central Afghanistan
 Hindustan – Persian name for India, broadly the Indian subcontinent.
 Indostan – archaic usage in European languages for Hindostan.
 Iraqi kurdistan – Kurdish-populated part of northern Iraq
 Kabulistan – a historical name of the territory centered around present-day Kabul Province of Afghanistan
 Kadagistan – Kadagistan was the name of an eastern Sasanian province in the region of Tokharistan (in what is now north-eastern Afghanistan).
 Kafiristan (land of the infidels) – historic region in Afghanistan until 1896, now known as Nuristan. A similarly named region exists in north Pakistan.
 Kohistan – several regions of this name exist
 Kurdistan – Kurdish region. See also Iranian Kurdistan, Iraqi Kurdistan, Syrian Kurdistan, and Turkish Kurdistan.
 Lazistan – a historical and cultural region of the Caucasus and Anatolia, traditionally inhabited by the Laz people.
 Lezgistan – ethnolinguistic region in southern Dagestan and northern Azerbaijan
 Moghulistan (Mughalistan) – a historical area in Central Asia that included parts of modern-day Kazakhstan, Kyrgyzstan, and Xinjiang
 North Waziristan – northern part of Waziristan region in Pakistan
 Pashtunistan – the area of Afghanistan and North-Western Pakistan historically inhabited by the Pashtun tribes
 Qabailistan – a region in western Khyber Pakhtunkhwa, Pakistan
 Quhistan – a region of medieval Persia, essentially the southern part of Greater Khorasan
 Registan – historic site in Samarkand, meaning "place of sand"
 Russian Turkestan – Turkestan in the Russian Empire, later Turkestan Autonomous SSR
 Sakastan or Sistan – a historical and geographical region in present-day eastern Iran (Sistan and Baluchestan Province) and southern Afghanistan
 Saraikistan – a region in the south-western part of Punjab, Pakistan, with a majority of Saraiki speakers
 South Waziristan – southern part of Waziristan region in Pakistan
 Tabaristan – a historical region along the southern coasts of the Caspian Sea
 Talyshstan – ethnolinguistic region in the SE Caucasus and NW Iran
 Tokharistan, Tocharistan or Tukharistan, also known as Balkh or Bactria – the ancient name of a historical region in Central Asia, located between the range of the Hindu Kush and the Amu Darya (Oxus)
 Turgistan or Turestan – a Sasanian province
 Turkestan or Turkistan – ethnolinguistic region of Turkic peoples and languages, encompassing Central Asia, northwest China, parts of the Caucasus, and Asia Minor
 Uyghurstan, China, same as East Turkestan
 Waziristan – a region of northwest Pakistan
 Zabulistan – a historical region roughly corresponding to today's Zabul Province in southern Afghanistan.

Proposed names 
 Bangalistan – a proposed state in India.
 Khalistan or Sikhistan – a proposed country created from areas within Punjab with a Sikh majority.
 Maronistan – a proposed name for Maronite state in Lebanon during the Lebanese Civil War.
 Romanistan – a proposed country for the Romani people.
 Zazaistan – a suggested name for the region where the Zazas live.
 Saraikistan  – a proposed province in Pakistan.

Fictional 
 Adjikistan – a fictional central Asian country in the video game SOCOM U.S. Navy SEALs: Combined Assault.
 Aldastan – a fictional central Asian country consisting of Kyrgyzstan and Tajikistan, from Command & Conquer: Generals.
 Antagonistan – a fictional country in Heavy Weapon
 Ardistan – a fictional country in the novel Ardistan und Djinnistan by Karl May.
 Avgatiganistan – a pun of 'Afghanistan', it means 'Fried eggs' ('Avga tiganista') in Greek. Fictional country by author Eugene Trivizas.
 Azadistan – a fictional kingdom from the anime Mobile Suit Gundam 00; it means "free land".
 Azmanastan (or Uzmenistan) – a fictional country and region in the film The Expendables 3.
 Bananastan – A fictional country from the Popeye the Sailor comic book series, which was ruled by Saddam Shahame, a parody of Saddam Hussein, an Iraqi dictator.
 Bangistan – a fictional country in the Bollywood movie Bangistan (2015) starring Riteish Deshmukh and Pulkit Samrat.
 Bazrakhistan – a fictional former Soviet republic in the movie Act of War (1998) starring Jack Scalia.
 Belgistan – a fictional Middle Eastern country in the anime Gasaraki.
 Berzerkistan – a fictional republic run by genocidal terrorist godhead and President for life, Trff Bmzklfrpz, in the comic strip Doonesbury.
 Brajikistan – a fictional country from season 2 of the teen sitcom Wingin' It.
 Capustan – a fictional city-state in Malazan Book of the Fallen.
 Cobrastan – a fake fictional country made up by a character named Jorji Costava in his passport from the game Papers, Please.
 Darujhistan – a fictional city-state in Malazan Book of the Fallen.
 Derkaderkastan – a fictional Middle Eastern country in Team America: World Police.
 Djinnistan – a fictional country in the novel Ardistan und Djinnistan by Karl May.
 Franistan – a fictional country referred to in the television show I Love Lucy.
 Frigistan – a fictional country in Heavy Weapon
 Hachmachistan – fictional country in Kickin' It
 Helmajistan – a fictional area from the anime Full Metal Panic!.
 Howduyustan ("how do you stand?") – a fictional country from the Uncle Scrooge comic book stories.
 Irakistan – a fictional country in the game Broforce
 Iranistan – an oriental region of Hyborea (Conan the Barbarian stories).
 Istan – a fictional island state in the online role-playing game, Guild Wars Nightfall.
 Jazeristan – fictional country in the movie The Misfits.
 Kamistan (Islamic Republic of) – a fictional Middle Eastern country featured in the television series 24.
 Kazanistan – an ideal state imagined by John Rawls in The Law of Peoples, in which there is a system of law, legal representation for all groups, and a respect for basic human rights, but not full democracy.
 Kehjistan – the state of the eastern jungles in the game Diablo II.
 Kekistan – a fictional country created by 4chan members that has become a political meme and online movement.
 Kerakhistan – a fictional Middle Eastern country featured in the tabletop miniature wargame Battlefield Evolution.
 Kerplakistan – fictional country in Big Time Rush
 Kreplachistan – a fictional country in the Austin Powers film series.
 Langbortistan – a fictional country in the Danish Donald Duck cartoons
 Lojbanistan – the fictional country Lojbanists imagine themselves inhabiting
 Moldovistan – a fictional island country in The Real Adventures of Jonny Quest.
 Obristan – a fictional country in Papers, Please.
 Paristan or Pari-estan – a fairyland in the folklore of Middle East, South Asia, and Central Asia.
 Pokolistan – a fictional country in DC Comics.
 Serdaristan – a fictional country in Battlefield: Bad Company.
 Taboulistan – a fictional country in Vive la France
 Takistan – a fictional country in ARMA 2: Operation Arrowhead.
 Tazbekistan – a fictional central Asian nation in the BBC television series Ambassadors.
 Trashcanistan – a fictional country mentioned by the hosts of "MXC".
 Turaqistan – a fictional country in the movie War, Inc.
 Turgistan – a fictional central Asian dictatorship in 6 Underground.
 Turmezistan – a fictional country in Doctor Who.
 Tyrgyzstan – a fictional country in the BBC television drama The State Within.
 Urzikstan – a fictional country in Call of Duty: Modern Warfare (2019 video game)
 Ustinkistan – fictional country in The Fairly OddParents
 Yakyakistan – a fictional northern country in My Little Pony: Friendship Is Magic.
 Zekistan – a fictional central Asian nation in the video game Full Spectrum Warrior.

Other 
 Absurdistan – sometimes used to satirically describe a country where everything goes wrong
 Angyalistan – a micronation that claims garbage patches in international waters
 Autistan – the "metaphorical country" of the autistic people
 Bailoutistan (or Bailoutistan 2.0) - sarcastic term for Greece following the European Union bail out packages, coined by Yanis Varoufakis in his book 'Adults in the Room: My Battle With the European and American Deep Establishment'
 Bimaristan – a kind of hospital in medieval Persia and the medieval Islamic world
 Bradistan – a moniker for Bradford, England, owing to its large population of Pakistani worker migrants
 Canuckistan (full name being The People's Republic of Soviet Canuckistan) – epithet for Canada, used by Pat Buchanan on 31 October 2002, on his television show on MSNBC in which he denounced Canadians as anti-American and the country as a haven for terrorists. He was reacting to Canadian criticisms of US security measures regarding Arab Canadians
 Cavaquistan (Cavaquistão in Portuguese) – a name coined after the former Portuguese President and Prime-Minister Aníbal Cavaco Silva, referring to the regions of Portugal where he achieved landslide victories in the elections held in the late 1980s and early 1990s (especially in the Viseu District); intended pun with Kazakhstan (Cazaquistão in Portuguese)
 Dalitstan.org – a Dalit advocacy website active until mid-2006, one of 18 websites that were blocked by the Indian government to check for hate messages following the 2006 Mumbai train bombings.
 Extremistan and Mediocristan – used by author Nassim Nicholas Taleb to illustrate concepts of black swan theory in The Black Swan: The Impact of the Highly Improbable
 Filmistan – a film-production company
 Fondukistan or Fondoqestān – an early medieval settlement and Buddhist monastery in Afghanistan
 Gazimestan – name of a monument commemorating the historical Battle of Kosovo
 Hookturnistan – satirical name of Melbourne, Victoria, due to the large number of hook turns on city roads
 Hamastan – a concept of a Palestinian Islamic government with Sharia as law
 Iranistan – a pseudo-orientalist mansion built for P. T. Barnum in 1848 in Connecticut
 Islamistan – means 'Land of Islam', used in various contexts
 Londonistan – French counter-terrorism agents gave the British/English capital of London this sobriquet. Sometimes used derogatorily to refer to the large immigrant, especially Muslim, population in London.
 Muristan – a complex of streets and shops in the Christian Quarter of the Old City of Jerusalem
 New Yorkistan – the title of the cover art for the 10 December 2001, edition of The New Yorker magazine
 The New Yorkistan map itself included various districts ending in -stan, e.g., Bronxistan, Cold Turkeystan, Fuhgeddabouditstan, Gaymenistan, Taxistan, Youdontunderstandistan, etc.
 Orbánistan – a derogatory term for Hungary under the rule of Viktor Orbán
 Paganistan – the pagan/neo-pagan community of Minneapolis-Saint Paul in Minnesota
 Quebecistan – a term coined by Barbara Kay in 2006 in reference to Quebec, Canada.
 Sarvestan – a Sasanian-era palace in the Iranian province of Sarvestan
 Shabestan – an underground space, usually found in the traditional architecture of mosques, houses, and schools in ancient Persia
 Shahrestan (several meanings)
 Skateistan – a skateboarding/educational organization based in Kabul, Afghanistan
 Talibanistan – a name for the government of Afghanistan under the Taliban
 Zaqistan – a micronation currently in Nevada

See also 

 -abad
 -an
 -desh
 -land
 -patnam
 -pur
 -tania
 Oikonyms in Western and South Asia

Notes

References

Sources

Further reading 
 Maciuszak, Kinga. The Persian Suffix -(e)stān 'The Land Of' Studia Etymologica Cracoviensia 13 (2008): 119–140.

External links 
 
 

Suffixes
Place name element etymologies
Persian words and phrases
Bengali words and phrases
English suffixes